Artemisia abrotanum, the southernwood, lad's love, or southern wormwood, is a species of  flowering plant in the sunflower family. It is native to Eurasia and Africa but naturalized in scattered locations in North America. Other common names include: old man, boy's love, oldman wormwood, lover's plant, appleringie, garderobe, Our Lord's wood, maid's ruin, garden sagebrush, European sage, sitherwood and lemon plant.

Southernwood has a strong camphor-like odour and was historically used as an air freshener or strewing herb. It forms a small bushy shrub, which is widely cultivated by gardeners. The grey-green leaves are small, narrow and feathery. The small flowers are yellow. It can easily be propagated by cuttings, or by division of the roots.

This plant has gained the Royal Horticultural Society's Award of Garden Merit.

Uses
A yellow dye can be extracted from the branches of the plant, for use with wool. Its dried leaves are used to keep moths away from wardrobes.  The volatile oil in the leaves is responsible for the strong, sharp, scent which repels moths and other insects. It was customary to lay sprays of the herb amongst clothes, or hang them in closets, and this is the origin of one of the southernwood's French names, "garderobe" ("clothes-preserver"). Judges carried posies of southernwood and rue to protect themselves from prisoners' contagious diseases, and some church-goers relied on the herb's sharp scent to keep them awake during long sermons.

The pungent, scented leaves and flowers are used in herbal teas. Young shoots were used to flavor pastries and puddings. In Italy, it is used as a culinary herb.

In the traditional medicine of East and North Bosnia and Herzegovina, aerial parts of Artemisia abrotanum are used in jaundice therapy.

A poem by Edward Thomas (1878 – 1917) concerns the herb: "Old Man or Lad's Love".

Toxicity 
Currently, it has been documented that all the aerial parts of Artemisia abrotanum contain substances that can be toxic to humans, due to the presence in the essential oil of bicyclic monoterpenes and phenylpropanoid s.

References

External links

Southernwood Spice Page by G. Katzer

abrotanum
Medicinal plants of Europe
Plant dyes
Plants described in 1753
Taxa named by Carl Linnaeus
Subshrubs